Magaria is a department of the Zinder Region in Niger. Its capital lies at the city of Magaria. As of 2011, the department had a total population of 696,717 people.

References

Departments of Niger
Zinder Region